Rear Admiral Chris Bennett  (born 8 December 1937, in KweKwe)(8 Dec 193717 August 2021) is the author of a number of books.

He attended school at Kingswood College before joining the South African Navy.

Naval career 
He commanded the Minesweeper  in 1972. He was promoted to rear admiral in 1986 and appointed as Flag Officer Commanding Naval Command West until January 1989. In 1989 he was appointed Chief of Naval Staff and then as Chief of Naval Support. He retired in 1990

Awards and decorations

Books 
 
  with Arne Söderlund

References

External links
Just Done Productions Publishing website 

1937 births
Living people
South African non-fiction writers
South African admirals
White South African people
Alumni of Kingswood College (South Africa)